Polybia is a genus of eusocial wasps ranging from Central to South America (Mexico to Brazil, Argentina). Some produce enough honey to be collected and eaten by local people.

Species

Rutilotrixa lateralis (Walker, 1849)
Rutilotrixa diversa (Paramonov, 1954)
Polybia aequatorialis Zavattari, 1906
Polybia affinis Buysson, 1908
Polybia anglica Cockerell, 1921
Polybia barbouri Bequard, 1943
Polybia batesi Richards, 1978
Polybia belemensis Richards, 1970
Polybia bicytarella Richards, 1951
Polybia bifasciata Saussure, 1854
Polybia bistriata (Fabricius, 1804)
Polybia brunnea (Curtis, 1844)
Polybia brunneiceps Cameron, 1912
Polybia catillifex Moebius, 1856
Polybia chrysothorax (Lichtenstein)
Polybia depressa (Ducke, 1905)
Polybia diguetana Buysson, 1905
Polybia dimidiata (Olivier, 1791)
Polybia dimorpha Richards, 1978
Polybia divisoria Richards, 1978
Polybia eberhardae Cooper, 1993
Polybia emaciata Lucas, 1879
Polybia erythrothoraxla Richards, 1978
Polybia fastidiosuscula Saussure, 1854
Polybia ficaria Richards, 1978
Polybia flavifrons Smith, 1857
Polybia flavitincta Fox, 1898
Polybia fulvicauda Cameron, 1912
Polybia furnaria Ihering, 1904
Polybia gorytoides Fox, 1898
Polybia ignobilis (Haliday, 1836)
Polybia incerta Ducke ,1907
Polybia invertita Giordani Soika, 1965
Polybia jurinei Saussure, 1854
Polybia juruana Ihering, 1904
Polybia laboriosa Saussure, 1853
Polybia liliacea (Fabricius, 1804)
Polybia luctuosus Smith, 1858
Polybia lugubris Saussure, 1854
Polybia micans Ducke, 1904
Polybia minarum Ducke, 1906
Polybia nausica Richards, 1951
Polybia nidulatrix Bequard, 1933
Polybia nigriceps Zavattari, 1906
Polybia nigrina Richards, 1978
Polybia oblita Cockerell, 1921
Polybia occidentalis (Olivier, 1791)
Polybia parvula
Polybia parvulina Richards, 1970
Polybia paulista Ihering, 1896
Polybia platycephala Richards, 1951
Polybia plebeja Saussure, 1867
Polybia procellosa Zavattari ,1906
Polybia pseudospilonota Giordani Soika, 1965
Polybia punctata Buysson, 1908
Polybia quadricincta Saussure, 1854
Polybia raui Bequard, 1933
Polybia rejecta (Fabricius, 1798)
Polybia richardsi Cooper, 1993
Polybia ruficeps Schrottky, 1902
Polybia rufitarsis Ducke ,1904
Polybia scrobalis Richards, 1970
Polybia scutellaris (White, 1841)
Polybia selvana Carpenter, 2002
Polybia sericea (Olivier, 1792)
Polybia signata Ducke ,1910
Polybia simillima Smith, 1862
Polybia singularis Ducke ,1909
Polybia spilonota Cameron, 1904
Polybia spinifex Richards, 1978
Polybia striata (Fabricius, 1787)
Polybia sulciscutis Cameron, 1912
Polybia tinctipennis Fox, 1898
Polybia uruguayensis Giordani Soika, 1965
Polybia velutina Ducke ,1907

References

Vespidae
Hymenoptera genera
Taxa named by Amédée Louis Michel le Peletier